Severe Tropical Storm Utor, known in the Philippines as Typhoon Feria, was a large and deadly system that caused heavy rains and landslides throughout the Philippines, Taiwan, and China. The eighth tropical depression and fourth named storm of the 2001 Pacific typhoon season, Utor formed on July 1 and intensified into a tropical storm shortly after. Utor was upgraded to a typhoon by the JTWC on July 3, and a day later, Utor was estimated to have peaked with 10-min winds of 110 km/h (70 mph), with the JTWC estimating 1-min winds of 150 km/h (90 mph). After passing just north of Luzon, Utor began to weaken, before making landfall on the district of Dapeng as a minimal typhoon. Utor caused 203 deaths, of which 168 were in the Philippines, 23 were in the province of Guangdong, 10 were in the province of Guangxi, and 2 were in Taiwan. Total damages from the storm amounted to $2.78 billion.

Meteorological history 

At 21:30 UTC on June 26, the Joint Typhoon Warning Center (JTWC) began monitoring a system in the Western Pacific ocean. On June 29 at 12:30 UTC, the JTWC issued a Tropical Cyclone Formation Alert (TCFA) on the system. The system continued moving to the southwest and on July 1 at 0:00 UTC both the Japan Meteorological Agency (JMA) and the JTWC upgraded the system to a tropical storm, with the JMA giving it the name Utor. Shortly after being named, Utor abruptly turned to the north, passing just west of the island of  Yap. On the next day at 6:00 UTC, Utor entered the Philippine Area of Responsibility and was named Feria by the Philippine Atmospheric, Geophysical and Astronomical Services Administration (PAGASA), which also began issuing advisories. Utor steered northwestward as it was gradually strengthening, being upgraded to a typhoon by the JTWC east of Luzon on July 3. The JMA followed suit, upgrading it to a severe tropical storm. Utor continued to strengthen as it continued northwestward, and on July 4, Utor made its closest approach to the island of Luzon, peaking in the process with 10-min winds of 110 km/h (70 mph), with the JTWC estimating 1-min winds of 150 km/h (90 mph). Utor developed a ragged eye during peak intensity, with the island of Calayan being in the eye. After peak intensity, Utor slowed down slightly, beginning to weaken as it approached the Chinese province of Guangdong. On July 6 at 0:00 UTC, Utor made landfall on the district of Dapeng as a minimal typhoon, quickly weakening over land. 18 hours later, the JTWC issued its final warning on the system, and the JMA followed suit not long after. Utor dissipated over the autonomous region of Guangxi.

Impacts

Philippines
Utor, while not a very strong storm, brought heavy rain causing many landslides and flooding throughout the countries it affected. Almost 1 million people spread out over 20 provinces in the Philippines were affected by the typhoon, with thousands of houses being destroyed or damaged. Effects and impacts from Utor in the Philippines amounted to greater than $37 million (2001 USD) in damage, as well as causing at least 168 fatalities. At least 17 landslides occurred throughout the Philippines. In Baguio, rainfall from Utor set a new 24-hour rain record. Due to the effects of the storm, on August 13, President Gloria Macapagal Arroyo declared a state of calamity in the Ilocos Region and in the Cordillera Administrative Region.

Hong Kong and China
During Utor's passage, a 980 hPa reading was recorded in Hong Kong. 87 flights were canceled and 402 more were delayed due to the storm on July 6 in Hong Kong, with crops, roads, power lines, and other infrastructure in Guangdong being heavily damaged. A total of 23 people were killed and damages in Guandong amounted to ¥6.7 billion (US$813 million) (2001 USD). In Guangxi, economic losses were estimated at ¥16 billion (US$1.93 billion) (2001 USD), with 10 people being killed and another 6,850 people injured. In Nanning, the Yong River rose to 5.4 meters above its danger level, the highest it has reached in 50 years.

Taiwan
Agricultural losses in Taiwan amounted to NT$68 million (US$2 thousand) (2001 USD). 2 people were killed and 6 were injured due to torrential rains and strong winds.

References 

2001 Pacific typhoon season
Typhoons in China
Typhoons in the Philippines
2001 in China
2001 in the Philippines